In general, a non-binding opinion is an opinion which is not binding on the person or organization emitting it. It does not place the person or organization emitting the opinion under the legal obligation to stand by that opinion. 

In particular, it may refer to:

 an opinion emitted by the United Kingdom Intellectual Property Office on the validity of a patent, see Non-binding opinion (United Kingdom patent law)
 the objective of the international preliminary report on patentability (under Chapter II of the Patent Cooperation Treaty), which is "to formulate a preliminary and non-binding opinion on the questions whether the claimed invention appears to be novel, to involve an inventive step (to be non-obvious), and to be industrially applicable"

References